Ian Martin (born 1953) is an English comedy writer.
Martin was a writer for the BAFTA-winning BBC series The Thick of It.  He was famously hired as "swearing consultant" in 2005 by the show's creator, Armando Iannucci, for Series 1 of the political satire and went on to become a full member of the writing team. He won an Emmy for his writing across five series of Veep and was BAFTA nominated for co-writing The Death of Stalin.

Early life
Martin was born in London and has lived in Lancaster since 1988.

Career
Ian Martin edits the satirical website martian.fm. He is a weekly columnist for the Architects' Journal and a regular contributor to The Guardian newspaper.

Other credits include writing additional material for the 2009 Oscar-nominated film In the Loop, the 2007 Armando Iannucci-created series Time Trumpet and several series of the radio show Armando Iannucci's Charm Offensive.

He is the author of The Coalition Chronicles (2011), a satirical and scatalogical account of a year in the parliamentary life of the Coalition government. He was a leading contributor to The Missing DoSAC Files (2010).

On 9 June 2014, Ian Martin gave a lecture at the Royal Academy in an evening event hosted by writer and broadcaster Patrick Wright as part of the 2014 Festival of Architecture.

Martin was a writer and supervising producer for the HBO series Veep, having written on five seasons and having acted the role of Dave Wickford in Season 2. In 2014 Armando Iannucci described Ian Martin in The Washington Post as being “very good at making the language of political debate suddenly become nonsensical.”

Martin's radio play  The Hartlepool Spy, concerning the Hartlepool monkey, was broadcast on BBC Radio 4 on Christmas Day 2018, with a cast including Michael Palin, Vic Reeves, Toby Jones, Gina McKee and Monica Dolan.

Personal life
Martin is married with two children and four grandchildren, at least two of whom live in Seoul.

In August 2015, Martin endorsed Jeremy Corbyn's campaign in the Labour Party leadership election. He wrote in The Guardian: "To win over public opinion, Labour must reflect it. Is that right? I think that's right. I think that's why they're all doing this synchronised frowning at poor repellent-ebullient Jeremy Corbyn and pretending he's a weirdo."

References

External links
 

1953 births
Living people
21st-century English writers
BBC people
English comedy writers
English satirists
English socialists
The Guardian people
People from London